Kendon is a surname. Notable people with the surname include:

 Adam Kendon, British authority on the topic of gesture
 Frank Kendon (1893–1959), English writer, poet and academic
 Olive Kendon (1897–1977), English educator and social activist

See also
 Kenion